The 2021–22 Southeastern Conference men's basketball season began with practices in October 2021, followed by the start of the 2021–22 NCAA Division I men's basketball season on November 9. Conference play started in late December and will end in March, after which 14 member teams will participate in the 2022 SEC men's basketball tournament at Amalie Arena in Tampa, Florida. The tournament champion is guaranteed a selection to the 2022 NCAA tournament.

Offseason
The season was initially slated to begin on November 10, 2020, but was postponed due to the COVID-19 pandemic, which prematurely ended the previous season and continues to affect the current one.

Preseason

Recruiting classes

Preseason watchlists
Below is a table of notable preseason watch lists.

Preseason All-American teams

Preseason polls

SEC Media Day selections

Preseason All-SEC teams

Honorable Mention

Midseason watchlists
Below is a table of notable midseason watch lists.

Final watchlists
Below is a table of notable year end watch lists.

Regular season

Early season tournaments

Records against other conferences
2021–22 records against non-conference foes as of (November 9, 2021):

Regular Season

Postseason

Big 12/SEC Challenge

Record against ranked non-conference opponents
This is a list of games against ranked opponents only (rankings from the AP Poll):

Team rankings are reflective of AP poll when the game was played, not current or final ranking

† denotes game was played on neutral site

Conference matrix
This table summarizes the head-to-head results between teams in conference play.

Points scored

Through March 18, 2021

Rankings

Head coaches

Note: Stats shown are before the beginning of the season. Overall and SEC records are from time at current school.

Postseason

SEC tournament

 March, 2022 at the Amalie Arena, Tampa, Florida. Teams will be seeded by conference record, with ties broken by record between the tied teams followed by record against the regular-season champion, if necessary.

NCAA tournament

Teams from the conference were selected to participate:

National Invitation tournament 
Number from the conference were selected to participate:

Honors and awards

Players of the Week

Totals per School

All-SEC Awards

Coaches

Players

Honorable Mention

AP 

Honorable Mention

All-District
The United States Basketball Writers Association (USBWA) named the following from the Pac-12 to their All-District Teams:

District VIII

All-District Team

District IX
Player of the Year

All-District Team

All-American

National awards

2022 NBA draft

Home game attendance 

Bold – At or exceed capacity
†Season high

References